Cephalotaxus harringtonia, commonly known as Japanese plum-yew, Harrington's cephalotaxus, or  cowtail pine, is a coniferous bush or small tree in the family Taxaceae. It is native to Japan, but is occasionally utilised in western gardens and several cultivars exist for these purposes. Japanese plum yew has been in cultivation in Europe since 1829, and many modern horticulturists are familiar with this Japanese species, named in honor of Charles Stanhope, 4th Earl of Harrington, one of the first to grow the plant in a European garden, at Elvaston.

Description
New shoots of C. harringtonii remain green for three years after forming and have ribs at the leaf bases. The buds are green in colour, globular in shape and very small at only 1 mm in length. There is one rank of leaves present on either side of the shoot, and these rise up above it and curve slightly inwards, forming a narrow V-shape somewhat akin to a dove's wings. The ranks are often vertical, but can be more flattened in shaded parts. The leaves are broadly linear in shape and measure about 5 cm long by 0.3 cm wide. They are abruptly pointed at the apex, leathery in texture and a bright matte yellowish-green on the upper-surface. The abaxial surface, or underside of the leaves, shows two broad, pale to silvery stomatal bands.

The species is dioecious and the male plants are typically densely covered with pairs of flowers that are pale cream in colour, though they become brown with time, and globular in shape. They are borne on 2 to 4 mm stalks beneath each pair of leaves. Pollen is released from March until May. The female individuals have two pairs of knob-like globose flowers that appear on curved stalks at the bases of the shoots. The fruit is obovoid in shape and measures 2.5 cm long by 1.5 cm wide. They are a smooth and pale green ín colour with dark green stipes, though when ripe they turn brown.

Taxonomy
The Japanese plum yew was first considered to be a yew when it was partially described by Thomas Andrew Knight in 1839 and as such was named Taxus harringtonii. It was reclassified by Philipp Franz von Siebold and Joseph Gerhard Zuccarini in 1846 with a new specific name, Cephalotaxus drupacea. Some botanists consider C. koreana and C. sinensis to be synonymous with C. harringtonii. Although normally found under the name Cephalotaxus harringtonia, that name violates the grammar rules of Botanical Latin and in 2012 was corrected to Cephalotaxus harringtonii. However, this opinion is still not universally accepted by taxonomists and therefore it is acceptable to use Cephalotaxus harringtonia until a definitive position has been agreed.

Range and habitat
Cephalotaxus harringtonii is present in Japan. Within Japan, the tree ranges from Kyūshū in the south to Hokkaidō in the north. More specifically, it is found in Hondo in the Chiba Prefecture on Mount Kiyosumi, which is located in the Awa District within the Awa Province. It is also found in the Nagasaki Prefecture and the Hiroshima Prefecture. The variety nana is found in eastern Honshū as well as Hokkaidō, most notably on seaside cliffs and in mountainous areas. They thrive in partial shade on deep, rich soils.

Cultivation
Cephalotaxus harringtonii has been in cultivation in the United Kingdom since 1829 and is infrequently encountered as a garden specimen. Of the several species that exist in the genus, the Japanese plum yew is the one most often encountered in western gardens.  Several cultivars exist:

'Fastigiata' was first selected in 1861 in Japan. It grows to 6 metres in height and it characterised by its broad cluster of erect stems and very dark green leaves that spread all around the stem and are strongly decurved. The shoots are unbranched in the upper parts of the plant, while the lower parts have somewhat chaotic projecting side-shoots that hang down and contain leaves in flat ranks. The flowers are also inconspicuous.

Pharmaceutics
Omacetaxine, a substance derived from the leaves of this plant, is a novel (as of 2008) anti-leukemia drug.

References

harringtonia
Flora of Japan
Least concern plants